Sylloge Tacticorum is thought to have been written in the middle of the tenth century, and is a work on the making of order and organization of military forces (i.e. tactics), and ways to outwit and overcome opponents in the field of battle (i.e. through the use of stratagems).

It contained a description of tactics which would later serve as an influence on the tactical system described in Praecepta Militaria by Nikephoros II Phokas.

The word sylloge means, in greek, a gathering of information on something.

Details
Heavy infantry men should have quadrilateral shields narrowing towards the bottom, prescribing the kataphraktoi shield.

Provides additionally instruction on religious rituals done prior to battle, and prayers to be recited upon victory.

See also
Intelligence assessment

Further reading

A Tenth-Century Byzantine Military Manual: The Sylloge Tacticorum, trans. Georgios Chatzelis and Jonathan Harris, Birmingham Byzantine and Ottoman Studies (London and New York: Routledge, 2017). 978-1-4724-7028-7.

Georgios Chatzelis, Byzantine Military Manuals as Literary Works and Practical Handbooks: The Case of the Tenth-Century Sylloge Tacticorum (London and New York: Routledge, 2019). 978-1-138-59601-6.

References

Byzantine military manuals